Kaspars Dumbris (born February 25, 1985 in Cēsis) is a retired Latvian biathlete.

He competed in the 2010 Winter Olympics for Latvia. His lone race was the individual, where he finished 73rd.

As of February 2013, his best performance at the Biathlon World Championships, is 12th, in the 2007 men's relay. His best individual performance is 41st, in the 2008 sprint.

As of February 2013, his best Biathlon World Cup finish is 7th, as part of the Latvian men's relay team at Oberhof in 2009/10. His best individual finish is 48th, in the individual at Pokljuka in 2007/08.

References 

1985 births
Biathletes at the 2010 Winter Olympics
Latvian male biathletes
Living people
Olympic biathletes of Latvia
People from Cēsis